Schomberg Observation Tower is a German observation tower that was constructed in 2005 and was finished in 2006. It is a steel truss tower that is used for observation, at the same time, used for mobile phone services. The tower is 60 meters high, including the antenna. It has an observation deck in 30 meters height.

History

The Schomberg Observation Tower is a German steel lattice observation tower that was built in 2005 and was finished in 2006. Used for observation and mobile phone communication, the tower can be visited daily during the summer months and also in winter, depending on the weather. Visitors can view the surrounding Sauerland region.

Geography

The Schomberg Observation Tower is located in the town of Sundern, in the kreis (district) of Hochsauerland, in the state of North Rhine-Westphalia. Its postal code is 59846.

See also

Lattice tower
Utbremen Radio Tower
Gross Reken Melchenberg Radio Tower
Gillerberg Observation Tower
Madona Radio Towers
Hochsauerlandkreis
Sundern

References

External links
SkyscraperPage Forum
Structurae

Towers completed in 2006
Observation towers in North Rhine-Westphalia
Buildings and structures in Hochsauerlandkreis